Nitraria schoberi, the nitrebush (a name it shares with other members of its genus), is a species of flowering plant in the family Nitrariaceae. It has an Irano-Turanian distribution. Its fruit, edible and salty-sweet, are collected by local peoples and eaten fresh or preserved. Archeological evidence shows that people have been eating the fruit since Epipalaeolithic times.

References

Nitrariaceae
Flora of Romania
Flora of East European Russia
Flora of South European Russia
Flora of the Caucasus
Flora of Western Asia
Flora of Central Asia
Flora of West Siberia
Flora of Altai (region)
Flora of West Himalaya
Plants described in 1759
Taxa named by Carl Linnaeus